Anant Prasad Sharma (25 December 1919 – October 1988) was an Indian Railway Union leader, politician who became Minister of State for Industry, and Union Minister of the government of India. He was also the Governor of the State of Punjab and the State of West Bengal. He was a member of the 3rd Lok Sabha and 5th Lok Sabha from Buxar (Lok Sabha constituency). He also remained member of the Rajya Sabha thrice, 1968-1971, 1978-1983 and 1984-1988.

Early years and education
Anant Sharma was born on 25 December 1919 to Ram Naresh Sharma, in his village named Gaudarh near Shahpur in Bhojpur District, Bihar (then in Shahabad District). He was born into a humble family. He studied at D.A.V. School.

Career
Sharma was a Railway Union Leader. Because of his career as a trade union leader, he was invited by  Jawaharlal Nehru, the first Prime Minister of independent India, to run for the Parliamentary elections from the constituency of Buxar, Bihar. He ran and won in 1962 and again in 1971. In 1966, he became the President of Bihar Pradesh Congress Committee (PCC).

In 1974, he was made the Minister of State for Industry, Government of India, under the Prime Ministership of Indira Gandhi. Thereafter, he went on to become the Union Minister for Ministries including Communications, Surface Transport, Shipping and Civil Aviation in Government of India. He was the Minister of Communications from 1982 to 1983. Shri A P Sharma became the Governor of the State of Punjab and the State of West Bengal in 1983.

Personal life
He was married to Tara Devi, and the couple had two sons. He died in October 1988.

His eldest son, Shri Hriday Narayan Sharma, an India Railway officer was asked by Shri Rajiv Gandhi to contest the Bihar State Assembly Elections from Dumraon in 1990. He is settled in Delhi along with his family.

References

 His second son was Mr manmohan Sharma was an officer in air India.his wife is also very religious

1919 births
1988 deaths
Trade unionists from Bihar
People from Bhojpur district, India
Governors of West Bengal
Governors of Punjab, India
Union ministers of state of India
Indian National Congress politicians
Lok Sabha members from Bihar
India MPs 1962–1967
India MPs 1971–1977
Rajya Sabha members from Bihar

Civil aviation ministers of India
Tourism ministers of India
Members of the Cabinet of India